A Touch of Music a Touch of Donovan is a compilation album from Scottish singer-songwriter Donovan. It was released in West Germany (Pye/Vogue Schallplatten LDVS 17171) in 1969.

History
In 1969, Pye Records compiled a two album set of Donovan's 1965 recordings and released it through Vogue Schallplatten in West Germany. The album contained songs from both of Donovan's Pye Records albums as well as single and EP tracks. The album was the first two record set of Donovan's Pye Records recordings.

Track listing
All tracks by Donovan Leitch, except where noted.

Side one
"Colours"
"Donna Donna" (Aaron Zeitlin, Sholom Secunda, Arthur S Kevess, Teddi Schwartz)
"Sunny Goodge Street"
"Summer Day Reflection Song"
"Oh Deed I Do" (Bert Jansch)
"Car Car" (Woody Guthrie)

Side two
"Catch the Wind"
"Ballad of a Crystal Man"
"To Try for the Sun"
"Keep on Truckin'" (traditional; arranged by Donovan Leitch)
"To Sing for You"
"Jersey Thursday"

Side three
"Candy Man"
"Ballad of Geraldine"
"Hey Gyp (Dig the Slowness)"
"Remember the Alamo" (Jane Bowers)
"You're Gonna Need Somebody on Your Bond" (traditional, arranged by Donovan Leitch)

Side four
"Turquoise"
"Universal Soldier" (Buffy Sainte-Marie)
"Why Do You Treat Me Like You Do?"
"The Little Tin Soldier" (Shawn Phillips)
"Cuttin' Out"
"The War Drags on" (Mick Softley)
"Josie"

External links
 A Touch Of Music A Touch Of Donovan – Donovan Unofficial Site

1969 compilation albums
Donovan compilation albums
Pye Records compilation albums
Albums produced by Geoff Stephens